Mark Daniel Little (born 20 August 1988) is an English professional footballer who plays for Penybont as a defender.

Career

Wolverhampton Wanderers
Born in Worcester and educated at Nunnery Wood High School, Little began his career as a youth player in Wolves' Academy and played a major role in the side who made it to the last four of the FA Youth Cup in 2005. He signed a three-year professional contract in August 2005 and had become a regular in the reserve side by the end of the 2005–06 season, and featured as an unused substitute for the first team throughout April 2006.

He made his first team debut in the League Cup at Chesterfield on 23 August 2006. This was followed by his league debut off the bench (on the opposite flank at left-back) at Leeds United on 10 September 2006.

Little went on to feature regularly throughout the season but didn't manage to continue this in the 2007–08 campaign. He was sent out on loan to League One side Northampton Town for a month in January 2008, later extended to three months. After beginning the following season with his parent club, but without breaking into the first team, he again returned to Sixfields on loan until the end of October. In late 2009, Little went out on loan again, this time for two months at League Two side Chesterfield.

Peterborough United
In March 2010 Little joined Championship strugglers Peterborough United on loan for the remainder of the season. After he was not offered a new contract at Wolves, Little signed for Peterborough in a three-year deal on 25 May 2010.

Bristol City
On 5 June 2014, Little left Peterborough after turning down a new contract offer. On 25 June 2014 it was confirmed Little would join Bristol City on a three-year contract from 1 July 2014. Little was part of the Bristol City squad that won League One (securing promotion to the Championship) and the Football League Trophy (meaning Little had been part of the winning side of the cup competition for two years running), scoring City's second goal and winning man of the match in the final of the latter. He was a regular starter in the Championship for Bristol City under Steve Cotterill and later, Lee Johnson.

Bolton Wanderers
His contract with Bristol City was not renewed after the 2016–17 season and he joined Bolton Wanderers.

Bristol Rovers
On 4 June 2019, Little joined Bristol Rovers on a free transfer. He scored his first goal for Rovers when he scored in an EFL Trophy tie against Swindon Town on 13 November 2019. In February 2021, Little spoke out about racial abuse that he had received in response to a post he made on Instagram, joining a host of footballers to have received racial abuse on social media in early 2021 as there were calls for social media companies to tackle abuse with real-life consequences. It was announced at the end of the 2020–21 season that Little's contract would not be renewed and he would be leaving the club.

Yeovil Town
On 25 June 2021, Little agreed a deal to join National League side Yeovil Town. At the end of the 2021–22 season, Little was released by Yeovil following the expiry of his contract.

Penybont
On 3 June 2022, Little joined Cymru Premier club Penybont following his release from Yeovil.

Career statistics

Honours
2010–11: League One Play-off Winner (promotion to The Championship) – Peterborough United
Football League Trophy: Winner 2013–14, 2014–15

References

External links

1988 births
Living people
Sportspeople from Worcester, England
Footballers from Worcestershire
English footballers
England youth international footballers
Association football defenders
Chesterfield F.C. players
Wolverhampton Wanderers F.C. players
Northampton Town F.C. players
Peterborough United F.C. players
Bristol City F.C. players
Bolton Wanderers F.C. players
Bristol Rovers F.C. players
Yeovil Town F.C. players
Penybont F.C. players
English Football League players
National League (English football) players
Black British sportsmen